Šarec is a Slovene surname. Notable people with the surname include: 

 Marjan Šarec (born 1977), Slovenian politician, actor, and comedian
 Veronika Šarec (born 1969), former alpine skier

See also 

 Šarac (surname), a Serbian, Montenegrin, Bosnian and Croatian surname

Slovene-language surnames